Shrabani Deodhar is an Indian film director and screenwriter who won the Indian National Film Award for her very first project, the 1993 feature film Lapandav.

Background
Dedhar has no formal training as a filmmaker.  Her parents were both doctors, and she concedes that her filmmaking knowledge came from her husband, cinematographer Debu Deodhar.  He advised she combines the sciences of what goes on behind-the-camera with that of motion pictures, and encouraged her to take film appreciation courses at the Film and Television Institute of India in Pune so as tmodo pursue her wish to become a filmmaker. He worked with her on her very first film, and with her on every one of her projects before she created Sata Lota Pan Sagla Khota.
 
Dedhar was slated to direct the upcoming Sugar, Salt Ani Prem for writer/producer Sonali Bangera, but when she chose to leave the project due to personal issues, Bangera opted to direct the film herself.

She recently completed work on Sata Lota Pan Sagla Khota, which is expected for release November 2014. Deodhar related that she conceived the idea before Rohit Shetty became a film director, and that while she intended to make the film "years ago", due to personal issues surrounding her husband's death in 2010, production was held off for four years. Her daughter Sai Deodhar encouraged her mother to consider the changes in Indian film industry during her four-year absence from filmmaking and move forward, resulting Shrabani's decision to use a younger set of actors for Stat Lota.

Deodhar is a creative director for Star Pravah and is on the jury of the 14th Indian Television Academy Awards.  She has plans to make additional films in both the Hindi and Bengali languages.

Filmography

 Lapandav (1993)
 Sarkarnama (1998)
 Silsila Hai Pyar Ka (1999) (and as writer)
 Lekaru (The Child) (2000)
 Penchaan (2005) (and as writer)
 Sata Lota Pan Sagla Khota (2014)
 Dekhaa Jaayega (2015)
 The Sholay Girl (2019) 
 Mogra Phulaalaa (2019)

Recognition
 1993, won National Film Award's Silver Lotus for 'Best Marathi Feature Film" for her first film, Lapandav.
 1998, won Filmfare Award for Sarkarnama
 1998, won Screen Award  for Sarkarnama
 1998, won Maharashtra State Film Award for Sarkarnama
 1998, nominated for V. Shantaram Award for Sarkarnama
 2000, won Maharashtra State Film Award for Lekaru'''
 2000, won Hollywood Award for Lekhru''

References

External links
 

Living people
20th-century Indian film directors
Film directors from Kolkata
1962 births
Marathi film directors
Marathi screenwriters
20th-century Indian dramatists and playwrights
Screenwriters from Kolkata